Aponoeme is a genus of beetles in the family Cerambycidae, containing the following species:

 Aponoeme amazonica Martins, 1985
 Aponoeme castanea Martins & Galileo, 1998

References

Xystrocerini